Richie Rich may refer to:

Arts and entertainment
 Richie Rich (comics), a fictional character in the Harvey Comics universe
 Richie Rich (1980 TV series), an animated TV series by Hanna-Barbera
 Richie Rich (1996 TV series), a animated television series by Harvey Films and Film Roman
 Richie Rich (2015 TV series), an American sitcom series by DreamWorks
 Richie Rich (film), 1994

People
 Richie Rich (designer) (fl. from 1993), an American fashion designer and personality
 Richie Rich (rapper) (Richard Serrell, born 1967), an American rapper
 DJ Richie Rich (Richard Lawson, fl. from 1988), a Jamaican-American DJ and producer
 The Real Richie Rich (born 1964), an American rapper and record producer

See also
 
 Richard Rich (disambiguation)
 Rishi Rich (Rishpal Singh Rekhi, born 1976), British-Indian music producer
 Ricky Rich (born 1999), Swedish rapper
 Ricky Rick (born 1986), Mexican singer
 Riky Rick (born 1987), South African rapper